On November 3, 1992, the District of Columbia held a U.S. House of Representatives election for its shadow representative. Unlike its non-voting delegate, the shadow representative is only recognized by the district and is not officially sworn or seated. One-term incumbent and inaugural office-holder Charles Moreland ran for reelection and won.

Primary elections
Primary elections were held on September 13.

Democratic primary

Candidates
 John Capozzi, IT professional and member of the Democratic Statehood Committee from Ward 6
 Charles Moreland, attorney and incumbent Shadow Representative from Ward 7

Campaign
Moreland, the incumbent Shadow Representative and inaugural office-holder, was challenged in the Democratic primary by John Capozzi. Moreland had been the subject of a number of controversies since he entered office. In September 1990, prior to his first election, news broke that Moreland had not filed federal or district taxes for at least five years. Moreland claimed this was a political statement intended to highlight the District's lack of representation. In February 1991, Moreland failed to appear at a court hearing over an unpaid loan made to purchase a 1983 Jaguar. Though a bench warrant was issued, Moreland was not taken into custody and during his reelection campaign he claimed to have resolved the loan issue.

Capozzi entered the primary critical of Moreland. He claimed Moreland's focus on community organizing was unsuccessful and the cause of statehood would be better served with more time spent on Capitol Hill lobbying legislators. Capozzi was critical of Moreland's strategy of tax evasion saying that it alienated members of Congress. Capozzi even insinuated that Moreland's failure to pay taxes was meant primarily for personal gain by saying: "This is supposed to be about lobbying for statehood, not some kind of 'Don Quixote' ride to avoid paying taxes," During the primary campaign, Moreland was reprimanded by the Office of Campaign Finance and Ethics for submitting campaign finance reports weeks after they were due. Moreland was also ordered to take down nearly 200 campaign posters for having insufficient information on their financing.

Results

Results by ward

Statehood Party primary

Candidates
 Faith, activist from Ward 1
 Paul J. McAllister, party Secretary-Treasurer from Ward 5

Campaign
Both candidates said they would attempt to build grassroots support for statehood though Faith claimed she would build a multiethnic and multireligious coalition.

Results

Republican primary
No candidates appeared on the Republican primary ballot and only write-in votes were cast.

Other candidates
A Republican candidate achieved ballot access through write-ins in the primary.

 Gloria R. Corn (Republican), ANC Commissioner in Ward 3

General election
The general election took place on November 3. Both challengers criticized Moreland's nonpayment of taxes as ineffective and insincere. During the campaign, Corn opposed statehood and said that if elected she would work to get more budget autonomy for DC as well as increased federal funding for anti-crime efforts.

Results

Results by ward

References

Washington, D.C., Shadow Representative elections
1992 elections in Washington, D.C.